Chartered in 1889 as the Chattanooga and Gulf Railroad, the Chickamauga and Durham Railroad (name adopted in 1891) was a  long railroad between Chickamauga and Durham, Georgia, USA.  The line was completed in 1892 but went bankrupt by 1894.  It was reorganized in 1897 as the Chattanooga and Durham Railroad.

Defunct Georgia (U.S. state) railroads
Railway companies established in 1891
Railway companies disestablished in 1897
Predecessors of the Central of Georgia Railway